Albert Warren "Tilly" Tillinghast (May 7, 1876 – May 19, 1942) was an American golf course architect. Tillinghast was one of the most prolific architects in the history of golf; he worked on more than 265 different courses. He was inducted into the World Golf Hall of Fame in 2015.

Tillinghast, along with William Flynn, George C. Thomas, Jr., Hugh Wilson, George Crump, and William Fownes together made up the "Philadelphia School" of golf course architecture. Together, the group designed over 300 courses, 27 of which are on in the top 100 golf courses in the world.

Personal life
Tillinghast was born in 1874 in Philadelphia, Pennsylvania, the son of Benjamin Collins Tillinghast, owner of a rubber goods company there.  He lived with his wife Lillian in Beverly Hills, California, and died at his daughter's home in Toledo, Ohio, in 1942. He had two daughters, including Elsie May Tillinghast Brown (1898–1974).

Career

Tillinghast-designed courses have hosted multiple professional golf major championships—the 1927, 1928, 1938 and 1949 PGA Championships, contested at Cedar Crest Park, Baltimore Country Club, Shawnee and Hermitage Country Club, respectively; the 2005 and 2016 PGA Championship, contested at Baltusrol Golf Club, which has also been the host of seven U.S. Opens; the 2006 and 2020 U.S. Open, contested at Winged Foot Golf Club; and many others. He also designed the course at the Ridgewood Country Club, used for the 1935 Ryder Cup and Scarboro Golf and Country Club in Toronto, host of the Canadian Open for four occasions. In 1916, he created the Municipal Golf Course, now called Brackenridge Park Golf Course in San Antonio, Texas which hosted the Texas Open from 1922 to 1959. He also designed Oak Hills Country Club in San Antonio, which hosted the Texas Open 24 times between 1960 and 1994. 

In Westchester County, New York alone, Tillinghast designed the Fenway Golf Club, Scarsdale; Wykagyl Country Club, New Rochelle; Old Oaks Country Club, Purchase; Quaker Ridge Golf Club, Scarsdale; Scarsdale Golf Club, Hartsdale, where he designed the back nine; Briar Hall Golf & Country Club and Sleepy Hollow Country Club in Briarcliff Manor; and Winged Foot Golf Club (East & West), Mamaroneck. In Rockland County, New York in 1920, Tillinghast created a course specifically for Paramount Pictures founder Adolph Zukor, now known as Paramount Country Club. Tillinghast was also the uncredited co-designer of several green complexes at Century Country Club in Purchase.

Results in major championships
Tillinghast also played in several major championships, including:

DNP = Did not play
WD = Withdrew
"T" indicates a tie for a place
DNQ = Did not qualify for match play portion
R256, R128, R64, R32, R16, QF, SF = Round in which player lost in match play
Yellow background for top-10

Legacy
The Wissahickon Course at the Philadelphia Cricket Club is dedicated to Tillinghast, who designed the course in 1920.

He was inducted into the World Golf Hall of Fame in 2015, the "sixth architect to be inducted into the World Golf Hall of Fame in the Lifetime Achievement category".

See also
 List of golf courses designed by A. W. Tillinghast

References

External links
 
 The Tillinghast Association official site
 "Top 10 Tillinghast Courses" (with photographs)
 The first biography of A.W. Tillinghast "Tillinghast: Creator of Golf Courses" was published in 2006 by Classics of Golf
 

American male golfers
Amateur golfers
Golf course architects
World Golf Hall of Fame inductees
Golfers from Philadelphia
People from Harrington Park, New Jersey
1876 births
1942 deaths